Jenny Lindfors, also known as the stage name Sailing Stones, is an Irish-Swedish singer-songwriter, vocalist, musician and composer. Under her own name she has released a solo album, When The Night Time Comes (2008) on Flock Music/ PIAS.

She now self-produces her music under the moniker Sailing Stones and has released two singles, "The Blazing Sun" (2017) and "Telescopes" (2017), and an EP, "She's A Rose" (2018). "Telescopes" and "Into Space" (taken from the EP) have received repeated airplay on BBC Radio 6 Music.

Discography

Albums (under 'Sailing Stones')
 Polymnia (2020)

Albums (under 'Jenny Lindfors')
 When The Night Time Comes (2008)

EPs (under 'Sailing Stones') 
 She's A Rose (2018)

Singles (under 'Sailing Stones') 
 "Polymnia" (2020)
 "Emmanuel" (2020)
 "Comfort" (2020)
 "Receive" (2020)
 "The Fire Escape" (2020)
 "Don't Tempt the Shadow" (2019)
 "To Know Nothing At All" (Telescopes) (2018)
 "Telescopes" (2017)
 "The Blazing Sun" (2017)

References

External links

Year of birth missing (living people)
Living people
Irish women singer-songwriters